XHOJ-FM is a radio station on 106.7 FM in Guadalajara, broadcasting from Cerro Grande Santa Fe. The station is owned by Radiorama and carries a rock format known as Máxima 106.7.

History
XHOJ received its first concession on August 25, 1993. The original concessionaire was Anáhuac Radio, S.A.

References

Radio stations in Guadalajara
Radio stations established in 1993